Golanik-e Olya (also Romanized as Golānīk-e ‘Olyā; also known as Kalānīk-e Bālā) is a village in Anzal-e Jonubi Rural District, Anzal District, Urmia County, West Azerbaijan Province, Iran. At the 2006 census, its population was 55, in 12 families.

References 

Populated places in Urmia County